Wraith (Zak-Del) is a character appearing in media published by Marvel Comics. Although Wraith first appears in the prologue as a vision,<ref>Annihilation: Conquest Prologue</ref> his first physical appearance was in Annihilation Conquest: Wraith #1 in Annihilation: Conquest.

Publication history
Wraith first appeared in Annihilation: Conquest: Wraith #1 (2007) and was created by Javier Grillo-Marxuach and Kyle Hotz. Wraith returned in Donny Cates and Geoff Shaw's 2019 relaunch of Guardians of the Galaxy.

Fictional character biography
Wraith is the son of Kree scientist Sim-Del, who created a power source sufficient to "light an entire galaxy". Kree society banished him, but he continued his work, using the power source to turn the barren planetoid he inhabited into a paradise. The Kree then destroyed him, his wife, and all traces of his work. However, his son was sent off on an escape ship. The ship drifted into The Exoteric Latitude, the space of the Nameless, an offshoot of the Kree, who were once ancient Kree explorers lost thousands of years ago,and their bodies were invaded by the Exolon, parasites that feed on the souls of living creatures. The Nameless made Zak-Del one of their own and were promptly infected with the Exolon. Because he had become a Nameless, he was subjected to endless self-inflicted torture, as this is the only way a Nameless can remember their life before losing their soul. He was haunted by the image of the signet ring worn by the man who killed his parents, and that is what brings him to Kree space — to hunt down that man. Wraith defeated the leader of the Nameless, and he stole their polymorphic weapon and a ship that transported him back into the galaxy to hunt down the man. Although his time with the Nameless made him rather cold and show brutal efficiency as a fighter, Wraith retains some pragmatic yet, moral standards.

Wraith first appeared when he incapacitated an entire Phalanx battle-cruiser, drawing the attention of both the Phalanx and the Resistance forces led by Ra-Venn opposing them. Because he capably made the Phalanx feel fear, as both sides wished to add him to their ranks. He gets tracked by the Phalanx to the resistance's base, and in allowing them to escape, he is captured and brought before Ronan the Accuser, head of the Kree empire since the end of the Annihilation War, now a slave and Head Inquisitor of the Phalanx. Though Ronan subjects Wraith to all manners of horrible torture, inflicting more pain than any Kree can withstand, Wraith refuses to give up his origins, finally prompting an infuriated Ronan to attempt to impale him on a spike. Wraith pulls himself off and immediately heals. Ronan states that due to his seeming immunity to pain, he is not Kree, but something else, like a wraith. It amuses the son of Sim-Del, and he decides that Wraith is a suitable new name for himself. Wraith then divulges his origins. He says that he pities Ronan because he is a slave. The Accuser decides the highest degree of torture he could inflict would be to make Wraith a slave to the Phalanx for all time, and he promptly infects Wraith with Phalanx technology.

Wraith remains steadfast and enters a self-induced coma-like state, causing frustration in Ronan and annoyance in the Phalanx. A vision of Sim-Del in Wraith's mind convinces him to continue fighting, as only the punishment of the man with the signet ring could set his and his wife's spirits free. His father also convinces him that he cannot find the man alone, and so Wraith enlists the help of Super-Skrull and Praxagora. The trio escape and meet up with the Resistance, saving them from a Phalanx warship. Although he has little interest in the war with the Phalanx, Wraith accepts the offer to join the Resistance and fight the Phalanx in return for their help in tracking down the people who murdered his family. With Wraith and crew's assistance, the rebellion manages to capture a Phalanx scientist who has information on the Phalanx's super weapon. After determining the deployment point and the time of the attack, the fleet launches a suicide mission to deliver Wraith, Super-Skrull and Praxagora to the scene, where they infiltrate the Phalanx fleet and find the weapon, a Phalanx-infected Supreme Intelligence. Here Wraith again sees his father's spirit, speaking through the Supreme Intelligence, who instructs him not to stop the weapon, but to let it activate, and then to release the Exolon and absorb the Supreme Intelligence's soul, not only saving the Kree, but also dealing a massive blow to the Phalanx and freeing Ronan from the Phalanx's control. Wraith also convinces Ronan to overcome his shame and lead the Kree against their captors. He himself remains with the resistance, not revealing what he has truly done, to later use the Supreme Intelligence's soul to become a beacon of hope for the people.

Wraith and allies travels to the planet Kree-Lar, a ceded territory of the Kree that is home to Ravenous (the former right-hand man of Annihilus from "Annihilation" storyline) and enemies to the Kree, at Ronan's behest. Wraith makes his wariness and distrust of this mission clear to Ronan before their ship is attacked and are sent crashing into the planet. The group land on the surface and found that the Phalanx engaging warfare with the Ravenous, but Wraith uses his Exolon parasites paralyze the Phalanx and stop the fighting. Recognizing Wraith being the key to dealing with the Phalanx, the Ravenous agreed to allow the group to see their leader. During the audience, Wraith demonstrates his powers the Ravenous before subduing him, allowing Ronan to access the secret chamber underneath the throne. Ronan leads Wraith the 15,000 Kree Sentries that lays dormant in the chamber, which Wraith and Praxagora reprogrammed to make the sentries immune to the Phalanx's abilities. As Ronan launches the 15,000 Kree Sentries to Hala to destroy all Phalanx and Phalanx-infected Kree on the Kree homeworld Hala, Wraith stands quietly aside as he watches Ronan enacts his plans and orders Ravenous to get them a ship to travel to Hala. Upon arriving in Hala's space system, the group notices other forces are fighting against the Phalanx, Praxagora is possessed by Ultron, who is the Phalanx Technarchy's primary director, and stuns Wraith so he can transfer his essence into the Sentries and adds them to his army. Ultron kills Praxagora and explodes the ship, but Wraith and the others are saved by the Super-Skrull' force field, who takes them Hala's surface. Upon seeing Adam Warlock and Phyla-Vell battling a giant-size Ultron, Wraith aids them by using the Exolon to trapped Ultron in his current body, allowing Phyla-Vell to finished him off. After the battle, Wraith uses his Exolon to purge any Phalanx-infected Kree citizens before continuing on his quest to find his family's killer.Official Handbook of the Marvel Universe A-Z Update #1

After Gamora killed Thanos in Infinity Wars, Wraith attended Thanos's funeral and witness Starfox showing all the guests a recording of Thanos stating that he uploaded his consciousness in a new body before his death. While Wraith watches everyone angrily debate whether Thanos was telling the truth, they are attack by the Black Order, who steals Thanos's body and rip open a hole in space, sending Wraith and everyone else into the rip. Wraith and many others are saved by Gladiator and the Shi'ar Empire, allowing Starfox to continue recruit warriors to find Gamora, the most likely candidate to be Thanos's new body. Wraith brings up the issue of the Black Order, but Starfox assure they are searching for them and Nebula states that the team should track down Nova to find Gamora's location. The Dark Guardians found Nova and ambush him, wounding him enough to crash land onto a planet. Wraith demands Nova to tell Gamora's location, stating the fact he does not want to harm him if does have to. Wraith also reveals his reason for helping Starfox is so he could find Knull, the ancient malevolent primordial deity who created the Klyntar and the Exolon. Wraith wants to have Knull free him from the Exolon parasites. When Gladiator and Cosmic Ghost Rider orders him to back off, Nova takes the chance to fly off again, but the team plans to track down again. As Nebula predicted, Nova leads them to Gamora, who was about Star-Lord's ship, and attack. Amidst the chaotic battle, Starfox and his team easily overwhelmed the Guardians and captured Gamora. After delivering Gamora to Starfox, Wraith demanded that Starfox uphold his part of their bargain. Starfox handed Wraith a flashdrive of all the information he collected on Knull, though he told Wraith the intel is not very much. When the Black Order and Hela appeared, Wraith did not intervene since he already got what he needed.

Eventually Wraith tracked down Knull on Klyntar and discovered the Exolon were discarded offshoots created by Knull, and had them stripped from him. After being kicked off into the space by Knull, he discovered that Knull also has an opposite, a god of light, and transported to Earth to tell Eddie Brock and died in the process.

Powers and abilities
Wraith is experienced fighter and possesses an unidentified polymorphic weapon which can take on a variety of forms, including a gun, a whip, a small blade, and devices like binoculars. As a Kree, Wraith possesses his species' unique physiology, having far greater natural attributes than a human and is resistant to poisons, toxins and diseases. Due to the Exolon parasites that infect and maintain his body, he possesses enhanced speed, strength and agility greater than a normal Kree, as well as an ability to heal himself from even the most egregious of wounds. He also does not age and cannot die, at least not in any way yet shown. By summoning swarms of Exolon, he can strike fear into his opponents, and, because the Exolon feed on souls, swarms of it appear—at least to the Phalanx— to eat the exposed soul of a living being. Due to the nature of the Nameless and their rituals of inflicting pain on themselves, he also has an unnaturally high tolerance for pain, not screaming or making any other negative reactions to it. Due to not being alive in conventional sense, Wraith also has an unspecific degree of immortality and is immune to scanners as he is not identify as a life-form. The Exolon also grants Wraith the ability to absorb energy blasts and the souls of other beings.

In other media
Television
Wraith appears in Guardians of the Galaxy, voiced by Jeff Bennett. This version resembled a member of the Kree before gradually becoming more like his comic book counterpart in each of his appearances. Prior to the series, Gamora brought Zak-Del's scientist father and an invention of his to Ronan the Accuser so he could weaponize it, but the scientist threw himself and the invention into a black hole. Ever since, Zak-Del blamed Gamora for what happened and swore revenge. In the episode "Fox on the Run", Zak-Del served as Gamora's first opponent in a series of trials organized by Ronan and the Grandmaster, but was defeated. However, he learned Gamora was only acting on Ronan's orders, so he shifted his vengeance towards him and later confronted him. The episode "It's Tricky" delves into Zak-Del's reputation as an assassin and bounty hunter who specializes in polymorphic weapons after he is arrested by the Nova Corps. Star-Lord attempted to loot his abandoned hideout, only to accidentally trigger a Tactigon weapon's detonation program. He took it to the planet Xandar to put it in a time stasis container before it could explode, but Zak-Del had broken out by this time and fought Star-Lord's team, the Guardians of the Galaxy, for stealing from him before Star-Lord froze him. In the episode "Money Changes Everything", Rocket competes with an escaped Zak-Del to apprehend the alien con artist Ichthyo Pike. All the while, the Kree alludes to the Exolon parasites inhabiting his body and showcases the powers they grant him. While Rocket was able to turn Pike over to the Nova Corps, their leader Irani Rael could not find Zak-Del and tells Rocket to find more bounties to pay off his debt. While he hijacked a Nova Corps ship to do so, Zak-Del attempted to claim a bounty on Rocket's head. In the episode "Gotta Get Outta This Place", Zak-Del makes a cameo as one of many witnesses called in by Phyla-Vell to testify against the Guardians after they were framed for a crime at the Kree Monument of Justice.

Video games
 Wraith appears in Marvel: Avengers Alliance 2.
 Wraith appears as a Toy Box townsperson in Disney Infinity 2.0 and Disney Infinity 3.0. Wraith appears in Minecraft as a DLC skin in the Guardians of the Galaxy Skin Pack.
Although he does not physically appear in Marvel's Guardians of the Galaxy'', a profile of Wraith can be accessed in the Nova Corps' database.

Collected editions

References

External links
 Wraith (Zak-Del) at Marvel Wiki

Comics characters introduced in 2007
Fictional whip users
Marvel Comics aliens
Marvel Comics extraterrestrial superheroes
Marvel Comics characters who can move at superhuman speeds
Marvel Comics characters with accelerated healing
Marvel Comics characters with superhuman strength
Kree
Marvel Comics male superheroes